Nicholas Dillon (born 25 March 1997) is a Trinidadian professional footballer who plays as a winger.

International career
Dillon made his debut for the Trinidad and Tobago national football team in a 1–0 friendly loss to Panama on 18 April 2018.

References

External links
 
 

1997 births
Living people
Trinidad and Tobago footballers
Trinidad and Tobago international footballers
Trinidad and Tobago under-20 international footballers
Association football wingers
Central F.C. players
K. Patro Eisden Maasmechelen players
Al-Mujazzal Club players
TT Pro League players
Saudi First Division League players
Trinidad and Tobago expatriate footballers
Trinidad and Tobago expatriate sportspeople in Belgium
Expatriate footballers in Belgium
Expatriate footballers in Saudi Arabia